Dylan Hill (born 22 April 2004) is an English professional footballer who plays as a midfielder for  club Northampton Town.

Career
Hill began at apprenticeship at Northampton Town at the start of the 2021–22 season following a year as an extended schoolboy, and in April was recognised by the League Football Education (LFE) in "The 11" after he overcame learning difficulties and dyscalculia to achieve well above his predicted grade on the BTEC Diploma at Moulton School. He made his first-team debut for the club on 20 September 2022, after coming on as a half-time substitute for Ben Fox in a 2–0 defeat to Cambridge United in an EFL Trophy match at Sixfields Stadium. Hill said that "I am speechless, and the experience I have got there is unreal".

Style of play
Hill is a midfielder with good ball-control skills.

Career statistics

References

2004 births
Living people
Footballers from Northampton
English footballers
Association football midfielders
Northampton Town F.C. players
English Football League players